Christián Frýdek (born 1 February 1999) is a Czech professional footballer who plays as a midfielder for Slovan Liberec. He is the son of former Czech international Martin Frýdek, along with his brother Martin, who is also a footballer.

Career
He made his senior league debut for Sparta Prague on 20 November 2016 in a Czech First League 3–0 home win against Karviná.

External links 
 
 Christián Frýdek official international statistics
 
 Christián Frýdek profile on the AC Sparta Prague official website

1999 births
Living people
Czech footballers
Czech Republic youth international footballers
German people of Czech descent
Czech First League players
Czech National Football League players
AC Sparta Prague players
FC Sellier & Bellot Vlašim players
FC Silon Táborsko players
FC Hradec Králové players
Association football midfielders
Sportspeople from Leverkusen
Footballers from North Rhine-Westphalia
FC Slovan Liberec players